Brian McCullough in a former American college baseball coach.

McCullough was Longwood's head coach in 2014. The Lancers went 22–33

McCullough pitched for Longwood while it transitioned to Division I, setting Lancer records for innings pitched and strikeouts.  He then played five seasons in independent baseball leagues, including the Frontier League, Northern League, and Atlantic League from 2007 through 2011.  He accepted a position as an assistant coach at Longwood beginning with the 2010 season, serving as pitching coach and recruiting coordinator under Buddy Bolding, the 32-year head coach of the Lancers.  After Bolding's retirement following the 2013 season, McCullough was elevated to the head coaching position.

McCullough was named the pitching coach for the Manhattan Jaspers baseball on July 10, 2015.

Head coaching record
The following is a table of McCullough's yearly records as an NCAA head coach.

References

External links

1985 births
Living people
Atlantic League Road Warriors players
Chillicothe Paints players
Fargo-Moorhead RedHawks players
Florence Freedom players
Longwood Lancers baseball coaches
Longwood Lancers baseball players
Manhattan Jaspers baseball coaches
Schaumburg Flyers players
Siena Saints baseball coaches
Somerset Patriots players
Washington Wild Things players
Windy City ThunderBolts players
Sportspeople from Virginia Beach, Virginia